Fritz Levitus or Löwitus, was an Austrian football player and coach.

He played in the Austrian championship first with Wiener AF in the seasons 1915, 1915–16 and 1916–17, and then with Hakoah Wien in the seasons 1921–22 and 1922–23.

Later he became a coach and managed Yugoslav club FK Vojvodina between 1936 and 1938. He also coached Maccabi Brno in Czechoslovakia.

References

Austrian footballers
Association football midfielders
SC Hakoah Wien footballers
Austrian football managers
FK Vojvodina managers
Austrian expatriate sportspeople in Yugoslavia
Expatriate football managers in Yugoslavia
Expatriate football managers in Czechoslovakia
Year of birth missing
Austrian expatriate sportspeople in Czechoslovakia